Superstar Nora Aunor is the fourth studio album by Filipino singer-actress Nora Aunor released in 1971 by Alpha Records Corporation in the Philippines in LP format and later released in 1999 in a compilation/ cd format.   The album contains 12 tracks, 11 of which are cover versions like "Superstar" which was popularized by The Carpenters in 1971. The one original composition, In My Life, became one of Nora Aunor's standards.

Track listing

Side One

Side Two

Album credits 
Arranged and Conducted by:

 Doming Valdez

Recorded At
 CAI Studios

Original Cover Design
 Rudy Retanan

References

See also
 Nora Aunor Discography

Nora Aunor albums
1971 albums